Elazar Menachem Man Shach (Elazar Shach; January 1, 1899 O.S. – November 2, 2001) was a prominent Haredi rabbi, heading the non-Hasidic Litvak Orthodox from the early 1970s until his death. He served as chair of the Council of Sages, and as one of three co-deans of the Ponevezh Yeshiva in Bnei Brak, along with Shmuel Rozovsky and Dovid Povarsky. Due to his differences with the Hasidic leadership of the Agudat Yisrael political party, he allied with Ovadia Yosef, with whom he founded the Shas party in 1984. Later, in 1988, Shach sharply criticized Ovadia Yosef, saying that, "Sepharadim are not yet ready for leadership positions", and subsequently founded the Degel HaTorah political party representing the Litvaks in the Israeli Knesset.

Early life 
Elazar Menachem Man Shach was born in Vabalninkas (Vaboilnik in Yiddish), a rural village in northern Lithuania, to Ezriel and Batsheva Shach (nee Levitan). The Shach family had been merchants for generations, while the Levitans were religious scholars who served various Lithuanian communities. As a child, Shach was considered an illui (child prodigy) and in 1909, aged 11, went to Panevėžys to study at the Ponevezh Yeshiva which was then headed by Isaac Jacob Rabinowitz. In 1913 he enrolled at Yeshivas Knesses Yisrael in Slabodka.

When World War I began in 1914, many of the Slabodka yeshiva students were dispersed across Europe. Shach initially returned to his family, but then began traveling across Lithuania from town to town, sleeping and eating wherever he could, while continuing to study Torah. During this period he described suffering considerable deprivation, living with inadequate sanitation and being compelled to wear tattered clothing and worn out shoes. He reportedly sequestered himself in an attic for two years not knowing where his parents were. In 1915, following the advice of Yechezkel Bernstein (author of Divrei Yechezkel), Shach traveled to Slutsk to study at the yeshiva there.

Escaping to the British Mandate of Palestine 

Shortly before the start of World War II and the Holocaust, several yeshivas began considering evacuating their rabbis, students, and families. Aharon Kotler escaped to the United States, traveling across Siberia and arriving in the United States during the war. In 1939, Shach first went to Vilna, where he stayed with Chaim Ozer Grodzinski. Later that year, both Shach's mother and his eldest daughter fell ill, and died. In early 1940, the Shach family decided to leave Lithuania. Shach's maternal uncle, Aron Levitan, had helped Kotler get emigration visas to the United States, but Shach, after consulting with Yitzchok Zev Soloveitchik and Grodzinski, decided instead to go to Mandatory Palestine, where Meltzer was serving as rosh yeshiva at Etz Chaim Yeshiva in Jerusalem. Shach would later serve as the rosh yeshiva there as well. His uncle helped him and his family get immigration certificates, and took them in after they arrived at his doorstep in a destitute condition.
in the Lomzha Yeshivah in Petach Tikvah, was the main Talmudic lecturer, while Rabbi Moshe Shmuel and Rabbi Shmuel Rozovsky delivered other specialized lectures in the Talmud studies.

Ponevezh yeshiva 
Several years after the re-establishment of the Ponevezh yeshiva in Bnei Brak, Shach was invited by Yosef Shlomo Kahaneman to become one of its deans, and, after discussing the proposal with Soloveitchik, he accepted the offer. Shach served in that capacity from 1954 until his death. At this yeshiva, Shach delivered a lecture on the Talmud every Tuesday, and also occasionally gave other classes to the student body of the yeshiva. 

Shach received semikhah (rabbinical ordination) from Isser Zalman Meltzer, and served as chairman of Chinuch Atzmai and Va'ad HaYeshivos. In the mid-1960s, Samuel Belkin offered Shach the position of senior rosh yeshivah at Yeshiva University in New York, which he politely declined. Shach's wife died in 1969 from complications connected to diabetes. From 1970 until his death, Shach was generally recognized by Lithuanian Haredim and some other Haredi circles as the Gadol Ha-Dor (great one of the generation). During his lifetime, Shach was a spiritual mentor to more than 100,000 Orthodox Jews.

Political life 

During the years of his leadership, more than just secularism and Zionism, Shach waged bitter wars against anybody he suspected of deviation from the classical Haredi path. At the behest of Aharon Kotler, Shach joined the Moetzes Gedolei HaTorah. When Zalman Sorotzkin died in 1966, Shach became president of the Moetzes Gedolei HaTorah, before later  resigning  from the Moetzes after the other leading rabbis refused to follow him. Shach wrote strongly in support of every observant citizen voting. He felt that a vote not cast for the right party or candidate was effectively a vote for the wrong party and candidate. This theme is consistent in his writings from the time that the State of Israel was established.

Shas ran for the 11th Knesset in 1984, and Shach called upon his "Lithuanian" followers to vote for it in the polls, a move that many saw as key political and religious move in Shach's split with the Hasidic-controlled Agudat Yisrael. While initially, Shas was largely under the aegis of Shach, Ovadia Yosef gradually exerted control over the party, culminating in Shas' decision to support the Labor party in the 13th Knesset in 1992.

On the eve of the November 1988 election, Shach officially broke away from Agudat Israel in protest at Hamodia publishing, as paid advertisements, a series of articles based on the teachings of Rabbi Menachem Mendel Schneersohn (the Lubavitcher Rebbe). Shach criticized Schneerson for his presumed messianic aspirations. Shach wanted the Aguda party to oppose Lubavitch; however, all but one (Belz) of the Hasidic groups within the party refused to back him. Shach and his followers then formed the Degel HaTorah ("Flag of the Torah") party to represent the non-Hasidic Ashkenazi Haredim.
Following a personal visit by Shach in Jerusalem to the leading rabbis and halachic decisors of the day, Yosef Shalom Eliashiv and Shlomo Zalman Auerbach, in order to seek their support for the new party, they agreed to lend support to it. Schneerson's followers mobilized to support the Agudat Yisrael party. In the end, Agudat Yisrael secured nearly three times the number of votes it had in 1984, and increased its Knesset representation from two seats to five, while Degel HaTorah only picked up two seats. 
After the bitter contest in the 1988 elections, Degel HaTorah conceded, and agreed to work together with Agudat Yisrael. They combined forces in the 1992 elections under the name of United Torah Judaism, an agreement which has continued to the present.

In a speech delivered prior to the 1992 elections, Shach said that Sephardim were still not fit for leadership, and aroused great anger among Sephardi voters. Following the elections, Shach instructed Shas not to join the government, while Ovadia Yosef instructed them to join; this precipitated an open rift between the parties. Shach then claimed that Shas had "removed itself from the Jewish community when it joined the wicked...".

Around 1995, Shach's political activity diminished, following deterioration in his health, before later ceasing altogether. After that, the two main leaders of the Degel HaTorah party were Yosef Shalom Eliashiv, followed by Aharon Yehuda Leib Shteinman.

Shach was deeply opposed to Zionism, both secular and religious. He was fiercely dismissive of secular Israelis and their culture. For example, during a 1990 speech, he lambasted secular kibbutzniks as "breeders of rabbits and pigs" who did not "know what Yom Kippur is". In the same speech, he said that the Labor Party had cut themselves off from their Jewish past and wished to "seek a new Torah". Labor Party politician Yossi Beilin said Shach's speech had set back relations between religious and secular Israelis by decades.

In 1985, four years after the Labor Party supported a liberalized abortion law, Shach refused to meet with Shimon Peres, since he would not even speak with a "murderer of fetuses".

In Haaretz, Shahar Ilan described him as "an ideologue" and "a zealot who repeatedly led his followers into ideological battles".

Shach never seemed concerned over the discord his harsh statements might cause, saying that, "There is no need to worry about machlokes [dispute], because if it is done for the sake of Heaven, in the end, it will endure... One is obligated to be a baal-machlokes [disputant]. It is no feat to be in agreement with everybody!"

Shach was also critical of Western democracy, once referring to it as a "cancer", adding that, "Only the sacred Torah is the true democracy."

The Holocaust 
Shach taught that the Holocaust was a divine punishment for the sins of the Jewish people, and for the abandoning of religious observance for the enlightenment. He caused outrage in the secular Israeli media when he stated that "the Holy One, blessed be He, kept score for hundreds of years until it added up to six million Jews". In his defence, Haredi MKs said his comments had been misconstrued, and were not meant to justify Nazi atrocities. Shach believed that the secularism of some Israelis would cause another Holocaust, and he once said that if the Education Ministry were to be placed in the hands of Meretz MK Shulamit Aloni, it would result in "over a million Israeli children being forced into apostasy, and that would be worse than what had happened to Jewish children during the Holocaust". Wishing to prevent deviation from the established order of prayers, he opposed the composition of new prayers to commemorate the victims of the Holocaust.

Position on serving in the Israeli military

In May 1998, following talk of a political compromise which would allow Haredim to perform national service by guarding holy places, Shach told his followers in a public statement that it is forbidden to serve in the army, and that "it is necessary to die for this". This is a case, Shach said, in which, halachically, one must "be killed, rather than transgress". This position was expressed in large ads placed in all three of Israel's daily newspapers on May 22, 1998. Shach is quoted as saying that, "Any yeshiva student who cheats the authorities and uses the exemption from service for anything other than real engagement in Torah study is a rodef (someone who threatens the lives of others)", and that "those who are not learning jeopardize the position of those who are learning as they should".

Position on territorial compromise
 
Shach supported the withdrawal from land under Israeli control, basing it upon the halakhic principle of pikuach nefesh ("[the] saving [of a] life"), in which the preservation of lives takes precedence over nearly all other obligations in the Torah, including those pertaining to the sanctity of land, though Shach's position was later questioned by Shmuel Tuvia Stern, who wondered why Shach hadn't provided halakhic references supporting his opinion.
Shach also criticized Israeli settlements in the West Bank and Gaza Strip as "a blatant attempt to provoke the international community", and called on Haredi Jews to avoid moving to such communities.
Shach often said that for true peace, it was "permitted and necessary to compromise on even half of the Land of Israel", and wrote that, "It is forbidden for the Israeli government to be stubborn about these things, as this will add fuel to the fire of anti-Semitism". When Yitzchak Hutner was asked to support this position, he refused, saying that, "agreement to other-than-biblical borders was tantamount to denial of the entire Torah".

Chabad and the Lubavitcher Rebbe 
Shach was undoubtedly the greatest antagonist of Rabbi Menachem Mendel Schneersohn and the only major Lithuanian rabbi to come out in force against the Chabad movement and its leader. From the 1970s onwards, Shach was publicly critical of Schneerson, accusing Chabad of false Messianism by claiming Schneerson had created a cult of crypto-messianism around himself. He objected to Schneerson's calling upon the Messiah to appear, and when some of Schneerson's followers proclaimed him the Messiah, Shach called for a boycott of Chabad and its institutions. In 1988, Shach denounced Schneerson as a meshiach sheker (false messiah), and compared Chabad Hasidim to the followers of the 17th century Sabbatai Zevi, branding as idolatrous Schneerson's statement that a rebbe is "the essence and being of God clothed in a body". Followers of Shach refused to eat meat slaughtered by Chabad Hasidim, refusing to recognize them as adherents of authentic Judaism. Shach also opposed  Chabad's Tefillin Campaign, and once described Schneerson as "the madman who sits in New York and drives the whole world crazy". He nevertheless prayed for his recovery, explaining that "I pray for the rebbe's recovery, and simultaneously also pray that he abandon his invalid way".

Schneerson, citing case law in the Shulchan Aruch, strongly opposed both peace talks with the Palestinians and relinquishing territory to them under any circumstances, while Shach supported the "land for peace" approach.

Attacks on other Orthodox rabbis and groups 

In addition to his criticism of Schneerson, Shach attacked the following rabbis:

Joseph B. Soloveitchik

In a lengthy attack on Joseph B. Soloveitchik (d. 1993) of Yeshiva University, Shach accused him of writing "things that are forbidden to hear", as well as of "... endangering the survival of Torah-true Judaism by indoctrinating the masses with actual words of heresy".

The Gerer Rebbe
 
Shach resigned from the Moetzes Gedolei HaTorah ("Council of Torah Greats") following tensions between him and the Gerer Rebbe, Simcha Bunim Alter. In the Eleventh Knesset elections of 1984, Shach had already told his supporters to vote for Shas, instead of Agudat Yisrael. Some perceived the schism as the re-emergence of the dissent between Hasidim and Mitnagdim, as Shach represented the Lithuanian Torah world, while the Gerer Rebbe was among the most important Hasidic Rebbes and represented the most significant Hasidic court in Agudat Yisrael. However, it would not be accurate to base the entire conflict on a renewal of the historic dispute between Hasidim and Mitnagdim which began in the latter half of the eighteenth century.

Adin Steinsaltz

Adin Steinsaltz was likewise accused of heresy by Shach, who, in a letter written September 10, 1988, wrote that "... and similarly, all his other works contain heresy. It is forbidden to debate with Steinsaltz, because, as a heretic, all the debates will only cause him to degenerate more. He is not a genuine person (ein tocho ke-baro), and everyone is obliged to distance themselves from him. This is the duty of the hour (mitzvah be-sha'atah). It will generate merit for the forthcoming Day of Judgement."

In summer 1989, a group of rabbis, including Shach, placed a ban on three of Steinsaltz's books.

The Modern Orthodox and Yeshiva University

Shach wrote that Yeshiva University-type institutions are an entirely negative phenomenon, posing a threat to the very endurance of authentic Judaism. Shach said that these modern conceptions were "an absolute disaster, causing the destruction of our Holy Torah. Even the so-called 'Touro College' in the USA is a terrible disaster, a ' churban ha-das ' (destruction of the Jewish religion)..."

Shach further writes that the success of those people who were able to achieve greatness in Torah, despite their involvement in secular studies, are "ma'aseh satan" (the work of the satanic forces), for the existence of such role models will entice others to follow suit, only to be doomed.

In a conversation that he had with an American rabbi in the 1980s, Shach stated, "The Americans think that I am too controversial and divisive. But in a time when no one else is willing to speak up on behalf of our true tradition, I feel myself impelled to do so."

Hasidic Judaism 
Shach wrote that he was not opposed to Hasidic Judaism, saying he recognized Hasidism as "yera'im" and "shlaymim" (God-fearing and wholesome), and full of Torah and mitzvos and fear of Heaven. Shach denied that he was a hater of Hasidim: "We are fighting against secularism in the yeshivas. Today, with the help of Heaven, people are learning Torah in both Hasidic and Lithuanian yeshivos. In my view, there is no difference between them; all of them are important and dear to me. In fact, go ahead, and ask your Hasidic friends with us at Ponevezh if I distinguish between Hasidic and Lithuanian students."

Death 

Shach died on November 2, 2001, two months short of his 103rd birthday (although other reports put his age at 108). His funeral in Bnei Brak was attended by up to 400,000 people. PM Ariel Sharon said: "There is no doubt that we have lost an important person who made his mark over many years." Chief Rabbi Yisrael Meir Lau said Shach's most important contribution were his efforts in restoring Jewish scholarship after the Holocaust. Haaretz described him as "an ideologue", and "a zealot who repeatedly led his followers into ideological battles". David Landau wrote that his "uniqueness lay in the authority he wielded", and that "perhaps not since the Gaon Elijah of Vilna, who lived in the latter part of the 18th century, has there been a rabbinical figure of such unchallenged power over the Orthodox world". Avi Shafran of Agudath Israel of America said: "His pronouncements and his talks when he was active would regularly capture the rapt attention of the entire Orthodox world." A dispute subsequently arose as to whether Yosef Shalom Eliashiv or Aharon Yehuda Leib Shteinman should succeed him. The towns of Bnei Brak and Beitar Illit have streets named after him.

Shach was survived by his daughter Devorah, who had nine children with Meir Tzvi Bergman, and his son Ephraim, who rejected the Haredi lifestyle and joined the Religious Zionist movement. Ephraim Shach served in the Israel Defense Forces, received a doctorate in history and philosophy from the Bernard Revel Graduate School of Yeshiva University, and worked as a supervisor for the Israel Ministry of Education. He married Tamara Yarlicht-Kowalsky, and they had two children. He died on October 17, 2011, at the age of 81.

Works 
Avi Ezri – Insights and expositions on various concepts in the Yad HaChazaka of the Rambam
Michtavim u'Maamarim – a collection of Shach's letters published in various editions of 4–6 volumes.

Further reading 

Harav Schach: Shehamafteach B'yado by Moshe Horovitz. Keter Publishing House, Jerusalem. 1989.
The Man of Vision: The Ultra-Orthodox Ideology of Rabbi Shach (Ish HaHashkafah: HaIdeologia HaHaredit al pi HaRav Shach), by Avishay Ben Haim, Mosaica Publishers
Maran Rosh HaYyeshiva Rav Shach – (designed for youth readers) by Rabbi Yechiel Michel Stern. The first comprehensive biographical sketch to appear in Hebrew after the demise of Rabbi Shach – Published by Israel Book Shop
Path to Greatness – The Life of Maran Harav Elazar Menachem Man Shach, Vol I: Vaboilnik to Bnei Brak (1899–1953) by Asher Bergman, translated by Yocheved Lavon. Feldheim Publishers 634 pages.

References

External links 
Eulogies and articles about Rabbi Shach:
 (Hebrew) Interview with Dr. Ephraim Shach about his father, Rabbi Elazar Shach
 Tzava'a of Rabbi Shach (in Hebrew)

Text:
 Shiurim (Hebrew) from Rabbi Shach on various masechtos
 Chiddushim (Hebrew) from Rabbi Shach on various talmudic topics
 Speech at the Sixth Knessiah Gedolah of World Agudath Israel in 1980 in Jerusalem
 Speech at eighth Siyum HaShas in 1982
 Speech at Agudah convention in 1982

Videos:
 Video of Rabbi Shach speaking at Degel Hatorah convention at Binyanei HaUma, and convention at Yad Eliyahu Arena (17 minutes into video) on March 26, 1990.
 Video of Rabbi Shach speaking at Kallah at Ponevezh Yeshiva
 Video of Rabbi Shach giving eulogy for Rabbi Moshe Feinstein at Etz Chaim Yeshiva

1899 births
2001 deaths
 
Chabad-Lubavitch related controversies
Haredi rabbis in Israel
Israeli centenarians
Israeli people of Lithuanian-Jewish descent
Lithuanian Haredi rabbis
Lithuanian emigrants to Mandatory Palestine
Men centenarians
People from Bnei Brak
People from Vabalninkas
Ponevezh Rosh yeshivas
Haredi rabbis in Mandatory Palestine
Rabbis in Bnei Brak
Rabai Shech